Gigantactis elsmani (common name - Elsman's whipnose) is a species of fish in the whipnose angler (Gigantactinidae) family, first described in 1981 by Erik Bertelsen, Theodore Wells Pietsch III and Robert J. Lavenberg. The genus name, Gigantactis, derives from the Greek, gigas (gigantic ) and aktis (ray), describing the genus by its long dorsal-fin spine which serves as a lure.

It has five dorsal soft rays and four to five anal soft rays.

It is a marine oceanic fish found in the south Atlantic and south Pacific oceans and hence in the territorial waters of islands in those oceans,  at depths of 0 metres to 3,000 metres. In Australia it has been found in waters off the coasts of Queensland and New South Wales.

References

Further reading

Stewart, A.L. and Pietsch, T.W. 2015. Family Gigantactinidae. In: Roberts, C., Stewart, A.L. and Struthers, C.D. (eds), The Fishes of New Zealand, pp. 932–936. Te Papa Press.

Deep sea fish
Bioluminescent fish
Taxa named by Theodore Wells Pietsch III
Fish described in 1981
Gigantactinidae
Taxa named by Erik Bertelsen